Leon Askin (born Leo Aschkenasy, 18 September 1907 – 3 June 2005) was an Austrian Jewish actor best known in North America for portraying the character General Burkhalter on the TV situation comedy Hogan's Heroes.

Life and career
Askin was born into a Jewish family in Vienna, the son of Malvine (Susman) and Samuel Aschkenazy (both of whom were later murdered in the Holocaust). According to his autobiography his first experience of show business occurred during World War I when he recited a poem before Emperor Franz Joseph.  In the 1920s, he studied acting with Louise Dumont and Max Reinhardt.  While working at Vienna's "ABC" cabaret theater in the 1930s, he frequently directed the works of dissident political writer Jura Soyfer.

Askin fled Austria to the United States in 1940, after having been beaten and abused by the Nazi SA and SS. His parents were murdered in the Treblinka death camp. He then served in World War II as a Staff Sergeant in the US Army Air Forces. After the war, he went to Hollywood to begin a career in films, invariably portraying foreign characters who speak English with a strong accent. Askin appeared as the Russian composer Anton Rubinstein in a Disneyland anthology episode of the life of Peter Tchaikovsky. Fans of the television series Adventures of Superman recall his portrayals of an eastern European diamond smuggler (Joseph Ferdinand) in the 1953 black-and-white episode "Superman in Exile", and as a South American prime minister in a color episode. He appeared in 20th Century Fox's biblical epic The Robe in 1953 as a Syrian guide named Abidor.  In 1960, he appeared in the film Pension Schöller, and the following year was prominently featured in Billy Wilder's film One, Two, Three, co-starring with James Cagney.

Askin gained wide recognition and popularity for his recurring role as the stern General Albert Burkhalter in the sitcom Hogan's Heroes, appearing in 67 episodes (including the pilot) of the show’s run from 1965 to 1971. Burkhalter was the gruff and portly commanding officer of Colonel Klink, the bungling commandant of a German World War II prisoner-of-war camp, manipulated by the American Colonel Hogan so the prisoners would get away with their clandestine activities.

Askin made guest appearances on The Restless Gun 1957 episode "The Shooting of Jett King", My Favorite Martian 1965 episode "Martin Of The Movies" as Von Reinbein. The Monkees 1967 episode "The Card Carrying Red Shoes", as Nicolai, on Daniel Boone in its 1969 episode "Benvenuto... Who?" as Roquelinm and in the "Fiddler in the House" episode of the 1974 situation comedy Paul Sand in Friends and Lovers as a violin virtuoso.  Between 1977 and 1979, he appeared in Steve Allen's PBS series, Meeting of Minds, portraying Martin Luther and Karl Marx. He portrayed a psychology professor in a season six episode of Happy Days. In 1979 he portrayed the character Mr. Hoffmeier of Hoffmeier’s Bakery, judging a pie contest in an episode in the third season of Three’s Company titled "The Bake-Off". 

His other film credits include roles in Road to Bali (1952), Desert Legion (1953), The Veils of Bagdad (1953), Knock on Wood (1954), Secret of the Incas (1954), Valley of the Kings (1954), Son of Sinbad (1955), The Last Blitzkrieg (1959), Lulu (1962), Sherlock Holmes and the Deadly Necklace (1962), Do Not Disturb (1965), What Did You Do in the War, Daddy? (1966), Double Trouble (1967), The Caper of the Golden Bulls (1967), The Perils of Pauline (1967), The Wicked Dreams of Paula Schultz (1968), A Fine Pair (1968), Guns for San Sebastian (1968),  The Maltese Bippy (1969), Death Knocks Twice (1969), Hammersmith Is Out (1972), The World's Greatest Athlete (1973), Going Ape! (1981), and Frightmare (1983). In 1982, he had a brief appearance as a Moscow Anchorman in the film Airplane II: The Sequel.
Askin had a role in the classic Mel Brooks comedy Young Frankenstein (1974), but his scenes were cut from the film.

Death
 
Askin died from natural causes in Vienna on June 3, 2005, at the age of 97 and is interred at Vienna Central Cemetery.

Filmography

Film

Television

Decorations and awards
 1988: Austrian Cross of Honour for Science and Art
 1994: Silver Medal for Service to the City of Vienna
 1996: Award of the title "professor"
 2001: Austrian Cross of Honour for Science and Art, 1st class
 2002: Gold Medal of Honour for Services to the city of Vienna
 2003: Goldener Rathausmann of Vienna to mark the 75th anniversary
 2007: Naming of Leon-Askin-Platz in Vienna-Penzing 
 2007: A bust of Leon Askin in Türkenschanzpark (Vienna)
 2007: Plaque unveiled at Hütteldorferstrasse 349 in Vienna-Penzing, to mark 100th anniversary of Askin's birth
 2009: At Sechsschimmelgasse 19 in Vienna-Alsergrund a public housing block was named after him
 27 May 2010: Leon-Askin-Park at Grundsteingasse in Ottakring (Vienna's 16th District) named after Askin

See also

References
Notes

External links

Literature on Leon Askin
 Leon Askin (in German) from the archive of the Österreichische Mediathek

1907 births
2005 deaths
20th-century Austrian male actors
21st-century Austrian male actors
Austrian expatriate male actors in the United States
Austrian expatriates in the United States
Austrian male film actors
Austrian male television actors
Burials at the Vienna Central Cemetery
Jewish Austrian male actors
Male actors from Vienna
Recipients of the Austrian Cross of Honour for Science and Art, 1st class